Murphys or Murphy's may refer to:

 Murphys, California, United States, an unincorporated village
 Murphys Grammar School, on the National Register of Historic Places
 Murphys Hotel, one of the oldest hotels still operating in California, on the National Register of Historic Places
 Murphys, former name of Meeks Bay, California, an unincorporated community

See also
 Murphy (disambiguation)
 Dropkick Murphys
 Murphy's (disambiguation)